Freocrossotus reticulatus is a species of beetle in the family Cerambycidae. It was described by Stephan von Breuning in 1964. It is known from the Gulf of Guinea.

References

Crossotini
Beetles described in 1964